Ochina latrellii is a species of beetle native to Europe and the Near East. In Europe, it is found only in Austria, Belgium, Croatia, the Czech Republic, mainland France, Germany, mainland Greece, Hungary, mainland Italy, Romania, Sardinia, Slovakia, mainland Spain, Switzerland, Ukraine and Yugoslavia.

External links
Ochina latrellii at Fauna Europaea

Ptinidae
Beetles described in 1812
Taxa named by Franco Andrea Bonelli